Pan Pan Narkprasert (born July 22, 1988), known as Pangina Heals, is a Thai drag queen and judge on Drag Race Thailand, who later went on to compete on RuPaul's Drag Race: UK vs the World (2022). She has been described as one of the most popular drag performers in Asia, and is often called the RuPaul of Thailand. Narkprasert founded the Bangkok drag venue, House of Heals.

Early life and education
Narkprasert was born to a Thai father and a Taiwanese mother in Bangkok. He was a student at Shrewsbury International School and Harrow International School Bangkok. He was bullied by his peers and battled depression and bulimia. He later lived in Los Angeles for four years, where he studied fine arts at the University of California. After graduating, Narkprasert returned to spend a year navigating Bangkok’s art scene. He entered his first competition, a Lady Gaga lookalike competition, in 2010 and won a trip to New York City to see her perform in concert. Eventually, with the help of local drag star Sira Soda, he learned how to dress and put on makeup.

Career
A well-known host in Thailand's drag circuit, Pangina Heals hosts a weekly LGBTQI+ night in Bangkok at the upmarket cabaret bar Maggie Choo's.

Narkprasert began Heals' performances as a dancer and is known for performing in the waacking style. Heals made her acting debut after joining the main cast of the play, The Lisbon Traviata, written by American playwright Terrence McNally and produced by English-language multicultural theatre group Culture Collective Studio, where she portrayed Mendy.

Heals opened for Tube Gallery's 20th anniversary fashion show. She is a part of the lineup for Melbourne’s Drag Exp in 2020. In June 2021, she hosted Queer Got Talent, an online talent competition.

Narkprasert is the creator and owner of House of Heals, a drag bar in Bangkok.

Television
As Pangina Heals, Narkprasert participated on Thailand's version of Lip Sync Battle and won the competition with a rendition of Lady Gaga's "Telephone". She competed and won T Battle, a Thai reality show where 13 local gender benders competed in singing, dancing and impersonation challenges. She also competed on Thailand Dance Now. In 2018, she was announced to co-host Drag Race Thailand, a Thai spin-off of RuPaul's Drag Race, produced by Kantana Group.

In January 2022, she was announced as one of the nine contestants on RuPaul's Drag Race: UK vs the World, making her the first ever contestant to have judged an iteration of the show before entering the competition. In the premiere episode, Pangina Heals won the episode after beating Jimbo to a lipsync to "Say You'll Be There" by The Spice Girls, and chose to eliminate Lemon from the competition. In Episode 3, Pangina won for the second time after beating Dutch contestant Janey Jacké in a lipsync performance to "We Like to Party! (The Vengabus)" by the Vengaboys and eliminated Jimbo. Heals was eliminated in the following episode, the Snatch Game, by Blu Hydrangea, after her performance as Mariah Carey in the Snatch Game, which she did not react well to.

Pangina Heals has a drag "daughter", Felicia Heals, who appeared in the casting special for the second season of Drag Race Thailand, becoming the first cisgender female queen to appear in the franchise.

Filmography

Film

Television

Music videos

Web series

See also
 List of University of California, Los Angeles people

References

External links

 

1988 births
Living people
Drag Race Thailand
Gay entertainers
Pangina Heals
University of California, Los Angeles alumni
Participants in British reality television series